Yerli may refer to:

 Yerli, İskilip, Turkey
 Cevat Yerli (born 1978), Turkish computer game developer

See also
 

Turkish-language surnames